Bradford Emerson Meade is a fictional character in the American dramedy series Ugly Betty, portrayed by Alan Dale.

Background 

Bradford Meade is a famous publishing mogul whose company, Meade Publications, publishes the popular fashion magazine MODE. He is the ex-husband of recovering alcoholic Claire Meade and the father of Daniel Meade, the womanizing editor-in-chief of MODE, and Alexis Meade, his transgender daughter.

Bradford is also responsible for making major changes at the magazine after the mysterious death of chief editor Fey Sommers, including handing over the day-to-day operations to the inexperienced Daniel. He is also responsible for getting Betty Suarez hired as Daniel's personal assistant because he didn't want his son to be tempted to sleep with his assistants anymore. Betty and Daniel form a very strong friendship.

Bradford's decision to put Daniel in charge and to make Betty his assistant are reasons alone for Creative Director Wilhelmina Slater—who wanted the editor-in-chief job—to plot against them in an effort to manipulate Bradford into reconsidering her for the top job.

It is eventually revealed that Bradford tampered with Fay's steering wheel. After noticing Fey's casket is closed at her funeral, he hires a private detective, Steve, to find out any information implicating him and whether she faked her death. Prior to her death, Bradford and Fey had an affair and later he broke into her apartment and retrieved a photo of them together. After the funeral, he burns the photo to hide it from Daniel and Bradford's wife Claire.

Bradford learns Fey is still alive and Steve is actually working for her (it is later discovered in "Sofia's Choice" Steve was really working for Wilhelmina). In turn, he hires a henchman, Mr. Green, to "clean up messes" starting with Mr. Green burying Steve in Fey's empty tomb—though Steve survives. Bradford plans to step up his scheme to bring Fey out into the open by any means, dead or alive, even though he is unaware his "late" son, Alex, is actually behind this scheme and is planning to frame him for Fey's murder, which happened during Fashion Week, when he was arrested. Alexis then stuns him by revealing her sex-change to the world as Bradford is about to hand over the reins to Daniel. He is actually innocent; it is revealed in the episode "Brothers", that Claire in fact killed her. When Claire visits him at Rikers Island and tells him she will turn herself in, Bradford begs her not to, but in the end she does and he is released immediately.

It is later revealed Bradford's company only publishes MODE; Claire is the actual owner of the magazine and has the ability to pull the strings. She is able to do this as Bradford had put the magazine under her name to evade taxes.

In the episode "Punch Out" it was revealed Bradford is turned on by women's feet (a fetish Fey Sommers exploited to keep their relationship alive). Wilhelmina uses this information to her advantage and seduces Bradford (successfully), so she could "own" and control Meade Publications. She also succeeded in convincing Bradford to divorce Claire after Wilhelmina made Marc beat her up, and told Bradford the injuries were caused by someone Claire hired.

In the season finale, he gave Wilhelmina an engagement ring he made himself, setting things up for a November wedding. Unbeknownst to Bradford, Claire had just escaped while en route to prison, hoping to stop him from marrying Wilhelmina. In the finale it was also revealed the brakes on Bradford's car had been cut by the hitman Alexis hired to kill her father; ironically, Alexis makes this discovery while driving the car in order to take Daniel to the hospital.

As the second season starts, Bradford is unaware (at first) that Wilhelmina is making sure that once they are married, she fully takes over Meade Publications. Claire tries to reach him so she can warn him and save their marriage, only to be thwarted by Wilhelmina. Meanwhile, speculation looms over whether he had an illegitimate child with Fey...who happens to be Amanda Tanen, the magazine receptionist and Daniel's ex-girlfriend; the results would come back negative. Wilhelmina trying to bond with Alexis, even as Daniel is suspicious of her true intentions. The latter would cause major friction when Bradford begins to favor Alexis over Daniel.

On the day of his wedding, Bradford collapses of a heart attack while at the altar with Wilhelmina; this after Daniel told him about Wilhelmina sleeping with her bodyguard. At the hospital Bradford would later come to his senses by admitting he really did love Daniel, learning about Wilhelmina's infidelity, and finally reconciling with Claire before she is arrested. He later dies in the I.C.U. moments after telling Betty to watch over Daniel.

Bradford's passing also opens up a new scheme for Wilhelmina. When she went to the morgue to see the body, she bribed the person who was about to do the preservation into acquiring Bradford's sperm so she can use them for impregnation.

In "Giving Up The Ghost", Bradford returns as a manifestation of Betty's guilt for not being there for Daniel, guiding Betty in her actions throughout the episode to save MODE. At the end of the episode when the lack of magazine cover issue is resolved, Bradford leaves Betty realizing she will now be there for Daniel. Having taken back her job at the magazine, Bradford comfortably disappears into the white light, and presumably his soul is now at peace.

He also appears in a video message for Alexis and Daniel in "Bananas for Betty", recorded weeks before his death.

Connections 

 Betty Suarez Assistant to Daniel Meade; He was responsible for getting Betty the job so she could keep Daniel from hiring attractive women just to sleep with. Her knowledge has helped Daniel succeed in their roles at MODE, which also pleased Bradford. And like his son, he seems to trust Betty a lot more, especially when he tells her to watch Daniel's financial responsibilities. She would be the last person who saw Bradford alive.
 Fey Sommers Former Editor-In-Chief; He had a 25-year affair with her and was under suspicion because he tampered with the steering on her car at the time of her death. He believed she was still alive (after the announcement of her death), thus prompting him to resort to sinister measures to expose her hoax.
 Wilhelmina Slater Creative Editor at MODE; After being passed over for the role as the editor-in-chief, she has secretly sought revenge by teaming up with Alexis Meade to drive a wedge between him and Daniel, as well as using manipulation tactics to convince him she is the right person for the job. She romanced him in an effort to get control of MODE away from his wife Claire, but may be aiming for the entire parent company so Claire won't pull the strings.
 Daniel Meade His younger son and Editor-In-Chief at MODE; Despite handing the job to him, Daniel is not so sure he can live up to the challenge, but has gained his trust even though the two had shown signs of a rift in their relationship, which was being fueled by Wilhelmina. They made peace before his passing.
 Alexis Meade His son-turned-daughter and Co-editor-in-chief at MODE; Before Alexis (then Alexander) had a sex change, Bradford did his best to try to persuade him to not become a woman. Alex faked his death in a skiing accident to secretly have a sex change and came out of hiding two years later. However, Bradford still did not accept Alexis and tried to have her fired. This failed due to Claire's ownership of MODE and her desire to see Daniel and Alexis work together. After Alexis turned down a $10 million offer to leave the company, Bradford took Wilhelmina's suggestion by enlisting Rodigo Veloso, the creative director at MODE Brasil, to romance her so he can get her out of the company and the Meade family for good, a plot which later failed. After being injured in a car crash (intended for Bradford), Alexis went into a coma, only to wake up thinking she is Alex, thus giving Bradford a scheme to change family history. He would later accept her as family again.
 Claire Meade Bradford's wife (now widow); She had been in and out of rehab due to her drinking problem, brought on by Bradford's affair with Fey. Although they are estranged, the two are still married. Even as she faces jail time, Bradford insists he will stay married to her, but thanks to Wilhelmina's tactics, he decided to divorce her. He would later reconcile with her for last time before her rearrest.
 Sofia Reyes Author and Editor-In-Chief of sister publication MYW; Bradford hired her to help launch a new magazine and was the one who gave her the newly created position.
 Steve Private detective; Was hired by Bradford to investigate Fey's death, only to discover he was working for Fey. But in Sofia's Choice it was revealed he was actually employed by Wilhelmina.
 Amanda Tanen Sommers Receptionist at MODE; Due to his affair with Fey Sommers, Amanda suspected Bradford may be her biological father. When the results came back it turned out to be negative.
 Mr. Green Bradford's henchman; Loyal to Bradford, his job is to "clean up messes," starting with disposing of Steve in the cemetery (Steve by the way, survived the melee).

Ugly Betty characters
Fictional characters from New York City
Fictional businesspeople
Fictional socialites
Fictional mass media owners
Television characters introduced in 2006

fr:Liste des personnages d'Ugly Betty